Rothay Manor is a country house near Ambleside in Cumbria. It is a Grade II listed building.

History
The house was built for John Crosfield, a merchant from Liverpool, in 1835 and was originally known as Rothay Bank. The veranda and balcony, which is made of cast iron, was conceived by Mrs Crosfield, who was French. The house came into the ownership of Sir George Mills McKay, treasurer of the English-Speaking Union and a Sheriff of London, in the early 20th century before becoming a hotel and having its name changed to Rothay Manor in 1936.

References

Sources

Country houses in Cumbria
Grade II listed houses in Cumbria
Ambleside